Abū Muḥammad ʿAbd Allāh ibn ʿAbd al-Raḥmān ibn Faḍl ibn Bahrām ibn ʿAbd al-Ṣamad al-Dārimī al-Tamīmī al-Samarqandī (181–255 AH / 797–869 CE) was a Muslim scholar and Imam of Arab ancestry or Persian background. His best known work is Sunan al-Darimi, a book collection of hadith.

Biography
Imam Darimi, came from the family tribe of Banu Darim ibn Malik ibn Hanzala ibn Zayd ibn Manah ibn Tamim or Banu Tamim the Arab tribe. He is also known as Imam Tamimi, in relation to Tamim ibn Murrah, who was amongst the ancestor of Banu Darim.

As stated by Darimi "I was born on the same year in which Imam Abd Allah ibn Mubarak had died. And Abd Allah ibn Mubarak died in 181 AH"

A number of scholars transmitted hadiths from him, including Muslim ibn al-Hajjaj, Abu Dawud al-Sijistani, Al-Tirmidhi, and Abu Zurʽa al-Razi.

Works 
Sunan al-Darimi - Some from among his collections of the Prophet Muhammad's ahadith.
Tafsir al-Darimi - Imam Dhahabi mentioned the work in Siyar A'lam al-Nubala Not extant
Al-Jami'a - Khatib al-Baghdadi has mentioned this in his Ta'rikh al-Baghdad.

See also 
 List of pre-modern Arab scientists and scholars
 List of Athari Scholars

References

External links
 Biodata at MuslimScholars.info

797 births
869 deaths
People from Samarkand
Persian Sunni Muslim scholars of Islam
Atharis
Shafi'is
Hadith compilers
Hadith scholars
9th-century Arabs
9th-century imams